John Allan McVeigh (August 1, 1925 – August 21, 2008) was a Canadian football player who played for the Edmonton Eskimos. He previously played junior football in Edmonton.

References

1925 births
Canadian football tackles
Edmonton Elks players
2008 deaths